Edgar Chías (born 1973) is a Mexican playwright, actor and theatre critic. He was born in Mexico City and attended UNAM where he studied theatre. He has written a number of plays including De insomnio y media noche, which was performed at the Royal Court Theatre in London in 2006 under the title On Insomnia and Midnight (English translation by David Johnston). He won the Oscar Liera Prize for Best Contemporary Play in 2007 for both Crack and De insomnio y media noche.

References

Mexican dramatists and playwrights
1973 births
People from Mexico City
Living people
Date of birth missing (living people)